Romesh Fernando (born 29 September 1977) is a Sri Lankan former cricketer. He played first-class cricket for several domestic teams in Sri Lanka between 1998 and 2004. He was also a part of Sri Lanka's squad for the 1998 Under-19 Cricket World Cup.

References

External links
 

1977 births
Living people
Sri Lankan cricketers
Colombo Cricket Club cricketers
Galle Cricket Club cricketers
Moratuwa Sports Club cricketers
Panadura Sports Club cricketers
Cricketers from Colombo